Broadcast Television Systems (BTS) was a joint venture between Robert Bosch GmbH's Fernseh Division and Philips Broadcast in Breda, Netherlands, formed in 1986.

History 

Philips had been in the broadcast market for many years with a line of PC- and LDK- Norelco professional video cameras and other video products. By the 1980s, the Norelco name was dropped in favour of Philips. Robert Bosch GmbH's Fernseh Division also had a long history going back to the early days of television (1929).

BTS's North America headquarters was at first located in Salt Lake City, Utah. This was later moved to Simi Valley, California, in 1991, later returning Salt Lake City. Also in 1991, BTS Latin America headed by Mario Castellanos entered into an agreement to provide Televisa SA of Mexico what was believed to be until that time, the largest equipment sale in history.

In 1995 Philips Electronics North America Corp. fully acquired BTS Inc., renaming it Philips Broadcast-Philips Digital Video Systems. The BTS Inc.'s Darmstadt factory in Germany was near the Darmstadt Train Station and European Space Operations Centre this was later moved a short distance to Weiterstadt, Germany.

In March 2001 Philips' broadcast video division was sold to Thomson SA, the current owner; the division was called Thomson Multimedia. In 2002, the French electronics giant Thomson SA also acquired the Grass Valley Group from Terry Gooding of San Diego, CA, USA. Grass Valley, Inc., the Thomson, Grass Valley, a Thomson Brand is headquartered in Nevada City, California.

The Thomson Film Division, located in Weiterstadt including the product line of Spirit DataCine, Bones Work station and LUTher 3D Color Space converter, was sold to Parter Capital Group . The sale was made public on Sept. 9, 2008 and completed on Dec. 1, 2008. The new headquarters is in Weiterstadt, in the former Bosch Fernseh - BTS factory. Parter Capital Group will continue to have worldwide offices to support products from Weiterstadt, Germany. The new name of the company is Digital Film Technology. On October 1, 2012 Precision Mechatronics and DFT were acquired by Prasad Corp, part of Prasad Studios. In 2013 DFT moved from Weiterstadt to Arheilgen-Darmstadt, Germany.

Grass Valley operated offices in the cities of all the former acquisitions:
 Cergy, France (Thomson World Headquarters)
 Salt Lake City, Utah, USA - from TeleMation Inc. -Bell and Howell - BTS
 Beaverton, Oregon, USA - from Tektronix
 Nevada City, California, USA - from Grass Valley Group
 Breda, Netherlands - from Philips - Norelco - BTS

After the financial crisis of 2008, Thomson became upside-down in its financial covenants and was forced by its creditors to divest itself of Grass Valley and other manufacturing entities. On January 29, 2009, Thomson announced that they were putting the Grass Valley division up for sale.

In 2010, the Grass Valley business unit, not including the head-end and transmission businesses, was acquired by private equity firm Francisco Partners and resumed operating as an independent company on January 1, 2011. Grass Valley still maintains offices worldwide.

Grass Valley was sold to Belden on February 6, 2014, Belden also owns Miranda.

Products 
See:
Fernseh - for German-made products
TeleMation Inc. for SLC products.

Philips invented the plumbicon pick up video camera tube in 1965; almost all of their color cameras used this award-winning tube. Starting with the LDK 90 camera, Philips used their Frame transfer CCD - Charge-coupled device. Philips' patented Dynamic Pixel Management (DPM) FT-17 CCD technology won awards and was first used in the 1994 LDK10 and LDK10p camera.

Philips-BTS product from Breda, Netherlands, professional video camera products:

EL-8020 B&W Studio 5 fixed lens
LDK2 1970s Norelco
LDH10 Norelco
LDH20 Norelco
LDH-0200 Studio Norelco
LDK3 Studio PC-80 Norelco
LDK4800 ? Triax repeater ? Camera ? 
LDK5 1971 Studio 3 tubes Philips
LDK6 1982 Studio 3 tubes Norelco/BTS
LDK9P BTS CCD 1993 HandHeld
LDK10 BTS DPM CCD 1994 
LDK10P BTS DPM CCD 1994 
LDK11 1976 ENG Backpack Norelco
LDK12 ENG
LDK13 1971 ENG Backpack Norelco

LDK14 1977 ENG 3 tubes Philips
LDK15 1974? ENG Norelco
LDK20 ~1997 BTS CCD 
LDK23HS BTS CCD Super slow mo 
LDK25 Studio
LDK26 1982 Studio
LDK33 Early Handheld 
LDK44 1984 Studio/ENG 3 tubes
LDK54 Handheld 3 tubes
LDK63 
LDK65 
LDK90 1987 BTS CCD HandHeld 
LDK91 BTS CCD HandHeld 
LDK93 BTS CCD HandHeld 
LDK491 ENG Philips DIODE GUN PLUMBICONS 

LDK614 LDK6 handheld 
LDK700 BTS CCD 
LDK910 BTS CCD Studio 
LDK9000 BTS CCD HDTV 
LDM42 B&W 1968 Studio
LDM53 B&W Studio
PC60 1965 Studio 3 tubes Norelco
PC70 1967 Studio 3 tubes Norelco
PC80 Studio Norelco LDK3 
PC100 Studio Norelco
PCP70 Handheld Norelco
PCP90 1968 Handheld Norelco
VIDEO 80 Handheld

Current:
LDK 300 CCD Thomson Grassvalley
LDK 400 CCD Thomson Grassvalley
LDK 500 CCD Thomson Grassvalley 2003
LDK23HS Mk2 CCD Super slow mo Thomson Grassvalley
LDK 5000 CCD Thomson Grassvalley
TTV 1657D CCD Thomson Grassvalley
LDK 20S CCD Thomson Grassvalley
LDK 1707 CCD Thomson Grassvalley
LDK 4000 CCD HDTV Thomson Grassvalley
LDK 5000 CCD HDTV Thomson Grassvalley
LDK 6000 CCD HDTV Thomson Grassvalley
LDK 6200 CCD HDTV Super SloMo 
LDK 8000 CCD HDTV/SDTV

Philips early VTRs:
LDL110 Portable
NL1500 cassette
LDL110 Portable 1977
NL1702 
VR202
VR2350

Awards 
Outstanding Achievement in Technical/Engineering Development Awards from National Academy of Television Arts & Sciences. 
1966-1967 PLUMBICON TUBE - N.V. Philips -Breda 
1987-1988 FGS 4000 computer animation system CGI- BTS -SLC, UT
1991-1992 Triaxial cable Technology for Color Television Cameras -N.V. Philips -Breda 
1992-1993 Prism Technology for Color Television Cameras -N.V. Philips -Breda 
1993-1994 Controlled Edge Enhancement Utilizing Skin Hue KeyingBTS and Ikegami (Joint Award) -Breda 
1997-1998 Development of a High Resolution Digital Film Scanner Eastman Kodak and Philips Germany. See Spirit DataCine
2000-2001 Pioneering developments in shared video-data storage systems for use in television video servers - BTS/Philips/Thomson/ - SLC, UT
2002-2003 Technology to simultaneously encode multiple video qualities and the corresponding metadata to enable real-time conformance and / or playout of the higher quality video (nominally broadcast) based on the decisions made using the lower quality proxies Montage. Philips and Thomson.

Photo gallery

See also 
Fernseh 
TeleMation Inc. 
Philips
Robert Bosch GmbH 
Norelco 
Grass Valley (company)
Thomson SA
Professional video camera

References 

 tmquest.com onBTS Product
thefreelibrary.com On BTS
thefreelibrary.com On BTS, ABC'S KGO-TV Picks BTS Video Server to Go All Digital; Also Pilot Program For ABC-OWNED Stations
patentmaps.com BTS Patents
electronics.zibb.com BTS Trademarks
business.highbeam.com BC plans playback for disk-based server; its San Francisco O&O also plots Media Pool project. (owned-and-operated television station; BTS Broadcast Television Systems Inc. Media Pool server), Article from: Broadcasting & Cable | May 15, 1995 | McConnell, Chris 
business.highbeam.com New cable networks going digital. (includes related article on Game Show Network) Article from: Broadcasting & Cable | January 9, 1995 | McConnell, Chris 
business.highbeam.com Media Pool tests the tapeless waters. (BTS digital disk-based recorder), Article from: Broadcasting & Cable | July 18, 1994 | McConnell, Chris
allbusiness.com KGO-TV picks BTS' Media Pool Video Server to provide all-digital system of the future. Las Vegas, Nev.--(Business Wire)--April 11, 1995—KGO-TV,
smpte.org 138th SMPTE Technical Conference Technical Papers Program, October 10–11, 1996, Los Angeles, Calif., Media Pool — Flexible Video Server Design for Television Broadcasting, by Charlie Bernstein1
patentstorm.us BTS, System and method for enabling a data/video server]
trademarks.justia.com Compositor I - Trademark Details
trademarkia.com Compositor I By: BTS-Broadcast Television Systems, Inc.
emmyonline.tv National Academy of Television Arts and Sciences, Outstanding Achievement in Technical/Engineering Development Awards, BTS Broadcast Television Systems, Inc. To BTS in recognition of their engineering contribution in 3D computer graphic technology and for development of the FGS 4000 computer animation system.
trademarks.justia.com MACH ONE - Trademark Details.
trademarkia.com MACH ONE By: BTS-Broadcast Television Systems, Inc.
The History of Television, 1942 to 2000,  By Albert Abramson, Christopher H. Sterling, Page 304]
trademarkia.com PIXELERATOR, By: BTS-Broadcast Television Systems, Inc., High-Speed Rendering Computer Processor For Use In Computer Graphics Application.
broadcasting101.ws BTS Logo
www.broadcasting101.ws LDK91 Camera
broadcasting101.ws LDK910 camera
broadcasting101.ws LDK-9000 
www.broadcasting101.ws BTS OB Van *tvcameramuseum.org List of BTS cameras
tvcameramuseum.org LDK614
tvcameramuseum.org XQ3427B Plumbicon camera tube.
tvcameramuseum.org LDK 6
tvcameramuseum.org LDH 200
tvcameramuseum.org LDK 11
tvcameramuseum.org LDK 12
tvcameramuseum.org LDK 13
tvcameramuseum.org  LDK 14
tvcameramuseum.org LDK 15
tvcameramuseum.org LDK 2
tvcameramuseum.org LDK 25
tvcameramuseum.org LDK 26
tvcameramuseum.org LDK 3
tvcameramuseum.org LDK 44
tvcameramuseum.org LDK 54
tvcameramuseum.org PC 60
[tvcameramuseum.org] LDK 54
tvcameramuseum.org List of cameras
tvcameramuseum.org EL 8000 cam

External links 

BTS Awards Page 8 and 11
Thomson Grassvalley Cameras
Camera Museum
The Museum of the Broadcast TV camera
Philips Cameras, Photos and Specs
Fernseh Museum
BTS/Thomson/Grass valley Hi-res Photo Archive
Cameras:
EL-8020 
PC-60
PC-70
PC-72
PCP-90
LDH-1
LDK-5
LDK-6
LDK-300
LDK-6200

Electronics companies of the Netherlands
Philips
Film and video technology
Cameras
Video storage
Film production
Technicolor SA